"As Long as You Care" is a song by English born Australian singer-songwriter Ruel. The song was released on 11 September 2020 as the lead single from his third EP, Bright Lights, Red Eyes, which was announced on the same day.

A translucent orange 7" vinyl was released on 14 July 2021, limited to 150 copies for Record Store Day 2021.

Music video 
The music video for "As Long as You Care" was directed by Grey Ghost and released on 10 September 2020. It features Ruel meandering around a 70s inspired house, while also playing various 70s television stereotypes on screens around the home, complimenting the smooth and groovy burn of the song itself.

Critical reception
Vivien Topalovic from Live Wire AU said "The song feels like it's straight out of the 1970s with its pulsating bass line and wavy guitar riffs. Along with Ruel's smooth and buttery voice, it's a match made in psychedelic heaven."

Track listing
7" (Sony Music Australia - 19439906307)
Side A: "As Long as You Care"
Side B: "As Long as You Care" (instrumental)

Charts

Certifications

References

2020 songs
Ruel (singer) songs
RCA Records singles
Songs written by Sarah Aarons
Songs written by Ruel (singer)
Songs written by M-Phazes